Jin Tielin (21 June 1940 – 15 November 2022) was a Chinese vocal professor, musician and artist. His disciples include Peng Liyuan, Li Guyi, Dong Wenhua, Tang Can, Song Zuying, Zhang Ye, Li Danyang, Yan Weiwen, Liu Bin, Lü Jihong, Dai Yuqiang, Zhang Yan, Zu Hai, Wang Lida, Chen Lili, Chang Sisi, Zhu Zhiwen, Leon Lai, and Michelle Reis. In 2006, he started Jin Tielin Vocal Arts Center in the China Conservatory of Music. Later, on 2 April 2013, Jin Tielin Vocal Arts Center was renamed and expanded to be Jin Tielin Chinese Vocal Education and Research Center in the China Conservatory of Music.

Biography
On 21 June 1940, Jin was born in Harbin, Binjiang Province (now Heilongjiang), then under the jurisdiction of Manchukuo. He is of the Manchu ethnic group. His father was a hospital director.

Jin Tielin graduated from the Central Conservatory of Music in 1965. After graduating, he was assigned to the Central Philharmonic Orchestra as a singer.

From 1981, Jin has worked in the China Conservatory of Music. From 1996 to 2009, he acted as the president of China Conservatory of Music.

Personal life and death
Li Guyi was Jin Tielin's first wife. She is a singer. Jin's second wife was Ma Qiuhua, a professor at China Conservatory of Music. They had a son named Jin Shengquan.

On 15 November 2022, he died in Beijing, at the age of 82.

References

Sources
 《中华好家风》金铁霖 马秋华：音乐之家, 中国河北卫视官方频道 China Hebei TV Official Channel, 2015-7-15
 金铁霖 中国著名声乐教育家，博士生导师 中国音乐学院 China Conservatory of Music Official Website. Retrieved 30 July 2019
 金铁霖中国声乐教研中心 中国音乐学院 China Conservatory of Music Official Website. Retrieved 30 July 2019
 马秋华 著名声乐教育家 中国音乐学院 教授 博士生导师 中国音乐学院 China Conservatory of Music Official Website. Retrieved 30 July 2019

External Links
 

1940 births
2022 deaths
Artists from Harbin
Chinese male singers
Musicians from Harbin
Members of the 9th Chinese People's Political Consultative Conference
Members of the 10th Chinese People's Political Consultative Conference
Members of the 12th Chinese People's Political Consultative Conference
Central Conservatory of Music alumni
Singers from Heilongjiang
Voice teachers